Haliplus pantherinus is a species of crawling water beetle in the family Haliplidae. It is found in North America.

References

Further reading

 
 

Haliplidae
Articles created by Qbugbot
Beetles described in 1938